Each team in the 2020 FIFA Club World Cup had to name a 23-man squad (three of whom must be goalkeepers). FIFA announced the squads on 1 February 2021.

Al Ahly
Manager:  Pitso Mosimane

Al-Duhail
Manager:  Sabri Lamouchi

Bayern Munich
Manager:  Hansi Flick

On 5 February 2021, Bayern Munich replaced the SARS-CoV-2 positive Javi Martínez with Tiago Dantas and the injured Alexander Nübel with Lukas Schneller.

Palmeiras
Manager:  Abel Ferreira

On 5 February 2021, Palmeiras replaced the injured Gabriel Veron with Lucas Esteves.

UANL
Manager:  Ricardo Ferretti

Ulsan Hyundai
Manager:  Hong Myung-bo

References

External links
 Official FIFA Club World Cup website

Squads
FIFA Club World Cup squads